South Wimbledon is an area of Wimbledon in south-west London in the London Borough of Merton, England.

History

Toponymy
It is marked on an Ordnance Survey map of 1876 as New Wimbledon and on a 1907 map as South Wimbledon. The name is derived from Wimbledon, which is located to the North.

Local government
South Wimbledon formed the northeastern section of the parish of Merton, with the separate parish of Wimbledon located to the north. The parish became the Merton Urban District in 1907, renamed Merton and Morden in 1913. South Wimbledon has formed part of the London Borough of Merton since 1965.

Urban development
South Wimbledon tube station was opened in 1926 on the corner of Merton High Street and Morden Road.

Geography
Wimbledon town centre is to the north, Morden to the south, Colliers Wood is to the east and to the west are Merton Park and Wimbledon Chase.

References

Districts of the London Borough of Merton
Areas of London